Ranaghat College, established in 1950, is a Government of West Bengal sponsored, UGC recognized, NAAC accredited, Public College in Ranaghat, West Bengal, India. It offers Undergraduate courses in Humanities, commerce and sciences. Also offers Postgraduate course in Bengali. It is affiliated to  University of Kalyani.

Departments

Chemistry
Physics
Mathematics
Botany
Zoology
Physiology
Statistics
Environmental Science
Computer Application
Bengali
English
Sanskrit
History
Geography
Political Science
Philosophy
Economics
Education
Sociology
Commerce
Physical Education

Accreditation
Ranaghat College is National Assessment and Accreditation Council (NAAC) accredited. The college is recognized by the University Grants Commission (UGC).

Notable alumni
 Asim Duttaroy, a Medical Scientist

See also

References

External links
Ranaghat College 
University of Kalyani
University Grants Commission
National Assessment and Accreditation Council

Colleges affiliated to University of Kalyani
Educational institutions established in 1950
Universities and colleges in Nadia district
1950 establishments in West Bengal